The Mobergellidae are a family of small shelly fossils from the lower Cambrian.  The small shells vary widely in shape, but are all bilaterally symmetrical discs with paired muscle scars radiating from the centre of the internal surface.

References 

Cambrian invertebrates
Prehistoric animal families
Cambrian first appearances
Cambrian extinctions
Animal families